The Camp Arboretum Sign Shop, located in Corvallis, Oregon, is listed on the National Register of Historic Places.

See also
 National Register of Historic Places listings in Benton County, Oregon

References

National Register of Historic Places in Benton County, Oregon
Buildings and structures in Corvallis, Oregon
Buildings and structures completed in 1936
Rustic architecture in Oregon
Civilian Conservation Corps in Oregon
1936 establishments in Oregon